Karl Dreier Leth (born 22 August 2002) is a Danish football player who plays for Skive IK.

Club career
He made his Danish Superliga debut for Randers FC on 13 September 2020 in a game against AC Horsens. On 4 February 2022, Leth moved to Faroese club Argja Bóltfelag. After much chaos at the club, Leth confirmed in early July 2022 that he had had his contract terminated at his own request.

On 3 August 2022, Leth joined Danish 2nd Division club Skive IK.

Honours
Randers
Danish Cup: 2020–21

References

External links
 

2002 births
Living people
People from Randers
Danish men's footballers
Danish expatriate men's footballers
Association football forwards
Randers FC players
Argja Bóltfelag players
Skive IK players
Danish Superliga players
Expatriate footballers in the Faroe Islands
Sportspeople from the Central Denmark Region